The Artistic-Cultural Collection of the Governmental Palaces of the State of São Paulo, Brazil, aims to document, preserve and divulge circa 3,500 works of art of great artistic and cultural significance, which belong to the state's heritage. These works of art are located in the historical buildings of the Palácio dos Bandeirantes (Bandeirantes Palace, which is the  seat of the government of São Paulo and the governor’s official residence), the Palácio do Horto (Horto Palace, the summer residence), in the city of São Paulo, and the Palácio Boa Vista (Boa Vista Palace, the winter residence), in Campos do Jordão.

The first pieces of the collection were acquired in the late Sixties, praising specially Brazilian art paintings, Baroque imagery, and artistic furniture, eclectic styles of chinaware, silver works and ornamental objects. Since then, new acquisitions have been made either by contests or donations.

The Artistic-Cultural Collection of the Paulist Palaces, as an institution that preserves the public heritage, promotes the public access to works of art of significant importance to the History of Brazilian art through exhibitions of paintings, sculptures, drafts, prints and objects. By doing this, the Collection intends to widen the production of artistic knowledge, promoting workshops with artists, guided tours, seminars and lectures on the exhibitions' themes.

Some works of art in the Collection

External links
Internet site of the Artistic-Cultural Collection of the Paulist Palaces, in English and Portuguese

Museums in São Paulo
Art museums and galleries in Brazil
Campos do Jordão